Kirsti Bergstø (born 1 July 1981) is a Norwegian politician serving as the leader of the Socialist Left Party since 2023. She previously served as one of the party's deputy leaders from 2017 to 2023.

Personal life 
Bergstø was born in Rana in Nordland. She is the daughter of Harald and Erna Bergstø, an engineer and a consultant respectfully.

She currently has a partner, and a son.

Political career

Youth wing 
She is the former leader of the Socialist Youth, the youth wing of the Socialist Left Party, and held this position between 2006 and 2008.

Parliament 
She served as a deputy representative to the Storting from Finnmark from 2005 to 2009. She was a deputy member of Finnmark county council from 1999 to 2003. From 2010 to 2012 she was a State Secretary in the Ministry of Children, Equality and Social Inclusion. 

She was a member of the Storting from Finnmark from 2013 to 2017, and again, from Akershus since 2021. In addition, she became the chair of the Standing Committee on Labour and Social Affairs.

Party deputy leader 
She was elected the party's deputy leader on 18 March 2017. 

From April to September 2022, she was acting party leader while Audun Lysbakken was on parental leave.

Party leader 

Following Lysbakken's announced departure as leader, Bergstø was floated as a possible contender to succeed him, alongside Torgeir Knag Fylkesnes and Kari Elisabeth Kaski. Bergstø officially declared her candidacy on 9 December. The party election committee unanimously designated her as party leader on 1 February 2023. She was formally elected leader on 18 March.

References

1981 births
Living people
People from Nesseby
Finnmark politicians
Socialist Left Party (Norway) politicians
Deputy members of the Storting
Norwegian state secretaries
Women members of the Storting
21st-century Norwegian politicians
21st-century Norwegian women politicians
Norwegian women state secretaries